Defenders of the Law is a 1931 American pre-Code crime film directed by Joseph Levering and starring Catherine Dale Owen, John Holland and Robert Gleckler.

Synopsis
A cop goes undercover to infiltrate a gang with strong political connections.

Cast
 Catherine Dale Owen as Alice Randall 
 John Holland as Police Captain Bill Houston 
 Robert Gleckler as Joe Velet aka Phil Terry 
 Edmund Breese as Police Commander Randall 
 Mae Busch as Mae Ward - Undercover Policewoman 
 Paul Panzer as Taroni - Gang Leader 
 Kit Guard as Kit - Velet's Chief Henchman 
 Joseph W. Girard as The Police Chief 
 Philo McCullough as Detecteive Tom Muldoon 
 Al Cooke as Cookie - the Photographer 
 Nick Thompson as Velet Henchman

References

Bibliography
 Michael R. Pitts. Poverty Row Studios, 1929–1940: An Illustrated History of 55 Independent Film Companies, with a Filmography for Each. McFarland & Company, 2005.

External links
 

1931 films
1931 crime films
American crime films
Films directed by Joseph Levering
1930s English-language films
1930s American films